People's Army for the Restoration of the Republic and Democracy or PARRD ( L’Armée Populaire pour la restauration de la  République et démocratie) is a rebel group operating in the Central African Republic (CAR). PARRD wants to overthrow current CAR President François Bozizé. PARRD has claimed responsibility for two major attacks, contributing to the influx of Central African refugees in southern Chad. During mid-October 2006, fighting between PARRD and government troops escalated, and on October 15, the International Federation of Human Rights Leagues (FIDH) reported that 70,000 refugees have fled the CAR to Chad and Cameroon. FIDH official, Marceau Sivieudehe, stated that: "It's obvious that the civilian population is the main victim of such a chaotic situation ... [they] are living in an absolutely precarious situation." S/he criticized the lack of attention the crisis in the CAR has been receiving from the international community and warned of a subregional collapse that could impact the CAR, Chad, and Cameroon.

References

See also
Chadian-Sudanese conflict
Central African Republic Bush War
Rebel groups in the Central African Republic